Juan Ruiz de Alarcón (c. 1581 - 4 August 1639) was a New Spain-born Spanish writer of the Golden Age who cultivated different  variants of dramaturgy. His works include the comedy La verdad sospechosa (es), which is considered a masterpiece of Latin American Baroque theater.

Family 
Juan Ruiz de Alarcón was born in Real de Taxco, later named Taxco de Alarcón in his honour. His family was of old Asturian nobility. The name Alarcón had been given to his ancestor Ferren Martínez de Ceballos by Alfonso VIII of Castile after he had successfully driven the Moors from the fortress of Alarcón near Cuenca in 1177. Juán Ruiz de Alarcón's maternal grandparents Hernando and María de Mendoza were among the first Spaniards to arrive in Mexico in 1535, when they established themselves in Taxco. Their daughter Leonor de Mendoza married Pedro Ruiz de Alarcón who was described as an hidalgo.

Juan Ruiz de Alarcón had four brothers: Pedro Ruiz de Alarcón, who was rector at the College of Saint John Lateran, Hernando Ruiz de Alarcón who was a priest and is known for having written a treatise documenting the non-Christian religious practices of the Nahua Indians of central Mexico, Gaspar and García, about whom little is known.

Life

Juan Ruiz de Alarcón was born about 1581 at Real de Taxco, New Spain, where his father was superintendent of mines; his mother was descended from one of Spain's most illustrious families, the Mendozas. He was small of stature  and suffered from hunchbackedness. Besides,  his  red haired complexion made him an occasional object of  scorn, since some sectors of the conservative  catholic society   in which he later  lived  held the prejudice that  Judas Iscariot was a redhead himself. Because of this, his critics often ridiculed his appearance rather than his works.

He went to Spain in 1600, where he studied law at the University of Salamanca. He continued his studies towards a Licentiate in Law—roughly equivalent to a modern master's degree—which he finished in 1605, without, however, taking the degree. Instead, he practiced law for a while in Seville, then in 1608 went back to Mexico, and in 1609 received the licentiate from the University of Mexico. He completed his studies for his doctorate fairly soon thereafter, but never received the degree, in all likelihood because of the rather substantial costs attached to the ceremony. He worked as a legal adviser for a while, as an advocate, and as an interim investigating judge, all the while trying repeatedly and unsuccessfully to gain a teaching chair at the University.

Returning to Spain about 1611, he entered the household of the marquis de Salinas, and began a frustrating life of job-seeking at court. At the same time, purely as a way of making money apparently, he threw himself into the heady literary and theatrical life of the capital, eventually having a number of his plays performed. His first play, El semejante de sí mismo was unsuccessful, yet it attracted attention to him. By some, he was ridiculed and criticized; from others he obtained support.

For ten years, he pursued this double life, until he finally secured first an interim and then a permanent appointment to the Royal Council of the Indies (1626) — rather like an appeals court for Spanish colonies in America. Apparently, when political success came, he all but stopped his literary efforts—although he did have two volumes of his plays published (in 1628 and 1634), perhaps because some of them had been pirated and previously published with false attributions to his theatrical rival Félix Lope de Vega. After thirteen years of legal service to the crown, he died at Madrid in 1639.

Literary career and importance

Alarcón was the least prolific of all the great dramatists of Spain and is one of the very few Spanish-Americans among the great dramatists of the Siglo de Oro. He wrote less than did others, and many of his works circulated under their names. He took pains to mull over his plays and polish both their versification and their general composition. Fitzmaurice-Kelly said of Alarcón: "There are Spanish dramatists greater than Ruiz de Alarcón: there is none whose work is of such even excellence"

He is the author of approximately twenty-five plays. Twenty of them were published by the playwright in two volumes. The first, from 1628, contains eight plays (Los favores del mundo, La industria y la suerte, Las paredes oyen, El semejante a sí mismo, La cueva de Salamanca, Mudarse por mejorarse, Todo es ventura and El desdichado en fingir); and the second volume from 1634 consists of twelve plays (Los empeños de un engaño, El dueño de las estrellas, La amistad castigada, La manganilla de Melilla, Ganar amigos, La verdad sospechosa, El anticristo, El tejedor de Segovia, La prueba de las promesas, Los pechos privilegiados, La crueldad por el honor and El examen de maridos). Other plays were published in collections. These include: Quien mal anda mal acaba, No hay mal que por bien no venga and La culpa busca la pena, y el agravio la venganza. He is also the author of a play written in collaboration, Algunas hazañas de las muchas de don García Hurtado de Mendoza (1622).

The most famous of his plays is La verdad sospechosa, (published in 1634). The first great French comedy in modern French literature, Corneille's Le menteur (The Liar), was confessedly modeled after it. Las paredes oyen (Walls have Ears) is often seen as a companion-piece since both plays deal with mendacity. His plays can be divided into at least three distinct categories: social comedies, political dramas and plays that dramatize astrology, magic and other occult practices. Among the political plays, El dueño de las estrellas stands out as a stunning tragedy, dealing with Lycurgus, the Spartan lawgiver. Although the oracle had predicted that he would either kill a king or be killed by one, when faced with the dilemma he commits suicide thus overcoming the power of the stars. A second political play, La amistad castigada, is unusual because the king is deposed at the end. The magic plays include astonishing instances of the occult at a time when such practices were frowned upon. See, for example, La cueva de Salamanca and La prueba de las promesas. Quien mal anda, mal acaba may be the first Spanish play that dramatizes a pact with the devil. Indeed, even in social comedies such as Las paredes oyen we can encounter extensive astrological allusions.

Embittered by his deformity, Alarcón was constantly engaged in personal quarrels with his rivals; but his attitude in these polemics is always dignified, and his crushing retort to Lope de Vega in Los pechos privilegiados is an unsurpassed example of cold, scornful invective.

More than any other Spanish dramatist, Alarcón was preoccupied with ethical aims, and his gift of dramatic presentation is as brilliant as his dialogue is natural and vivacious. It has been alleged that his non-Spanish origin is noticeable in his plays, and there is some foundation for the observation; but his workmanship is exceptionally conscientious, and in El Tejedor de Segovia he produced a masterpiece of national art, national sentiment and national expression.

Works

Dramas in verse

La verdad sospechosa (Suspect Truth)
Los favores del mundo
La industria y la suerte
Las paredes oyen (The Walls Have Ears)
El semejante a sí mismo (He Who is Similar to Himself)
La cueva de Salamanca (The Cave in Salamanca)
Mudarse por mejorarse
Todo es ventura
El desdichado en fingir
Los empeños de un engaño
El dueño de las estrellas (The Master of the Stars)
La amistad castigada (Friendship Punished)
La manganilla de Melilla (The Stratagem at Melilla)
Ganar amigos
El anticristo (The Antichrist)
El tejedor de Segovia (The Weaver from Segovia)
La prueba de las promesas (Trial through Promises)
Los pechos privilegiados
La crueldad por el honor
El examen de maridos  (The Test of Suitors)
Quien mal anda en mal acaba  (He Who Follows an Evil Way Ends Evilly)
No hay mal que por bien no venga
 La Monja Alférez (The Nun Lieutenant), based on Catalina de Erauso

Non-dramatic texts in verse

Una redondilla y cuatro décimas sobre el asunto que luego se verá
Vejamen académico a Bricián Díez Cruzate, cuando se doctoró en la Universidad de México (1609-1613)
Décima del licenciado don Juan Ruiz de Alarcón, natural de México
Romance contra don Francisco de Quevedo
El licenciado don Juan Ruiz de Alarcón y Mendoza a don Diego Agreda y Vargas
Al doctor Cristóbal Pérez de Herrera, el licenciado don Juan Ruiz de Alarcón y Mendoza
A don Gonzalo de Céspedes y Meneses, el licenciado don Juan Ruiz de Alarcón y Mendoza
Al Santo Cristo que se halló en Prete, ciudad del Palatinado inferior, quitado de la Cruz y hecho pedazos por los calvinistas, restaurado por los católicos,  el licenciado Juan Ruiz de Alarcón dirige estos sonetos
De don Juan Ruiz de Alarcón en la muerte del Conde de Villamedina (21 de agosto de 1622)
Elogio descriptivo a las fiestas que Su Majestad del rey Filipo IIII hizo por su persona en Madrid, a 21 de agosto de 1623 años, a la celebración de los conciertos entr el serenísimo Carlos Estuardo, Príncipe de Inglaterra, y la serenísima María de Austria, Infanta de Castilla, al Duque Adelantado & c.
El licenciado don Juan Ruiz de Alarcón y Mendoza, al mismo (José Camerino)
Al volcán en incendios del Vesubio, el licenciado don Juan Ruiz de Alarcón y Mendoza, Relator del Consejo de Indias. Epigrama XXIX
Sonero dedicado al mismo asunto que el anterior
Sátira contra don Francisco de Quevedo
El licenciado don Juan Ruiz de Alarcón y Mendoza, Relator del Consejo de las Indias. Al autor. Décimas

Notes

References 
 Castro Leal, Antonio. Juan Ruiz de Alarcón. Su vida y su obra. México: Cuadernos Americanos, 1943.
 Cull, John T. "Some Stylistic Hallmarks in the Dramatic Works of Juan Ruiz de Alarcón." Bulletin of the Comediantes 68, no. 1 (2016): 39-64.
 De Armas, Frederick A., "El sol sale a medianoche: amor y astrología en Las paredes oyen", Criticón 59 (1993): 119-26.
 Fitzmaurice-Kelly, James. A History of Spanish Literature. New York: Appleton and Company, 1900.
 Foley, Augusta E. Occult Arts and Doctrine in the Theater of Juan Ruiz de Alarcón. Geneva: Droz, 1972.
 Garza Cuarón, Beatriz, Historia de la literatura mexicana: desde sus orígenes hasta nuestros días, vol. 2, México, Siglo XXI, 1996.
 Halpern, Cynthia. The Political Theater of Early Seventeenth-Century Spain with Special Reference to Juan Ruiz de Alarcón. New York: Peter    Lang, 1993 
 Josa, Lola, El arte dramático de Juan Ruiz de Alarcón. Kassel: Reichenberger, 2003. 
 King, Willard F. Juan Ruiz de Alarcón: letrado y dramaturgo. Mexico City: Colegio de México, 1989.
 Parr, James A. Critical Essays on the Life and Work of Juan Ruiz de Alarcón. Madrid: Dos Continentes, 1972.
Parr, James A. "On Fate, Suicide, and Free Will in Alarcón's El dueño de las estrellas,"  Hispanic Review 42 (1974): 199-207.
 Parr, James A. “Virtus, Honor, Noblesse Oblige: La verdad sospechosa and Las paredes oyen as Companion Pieces,” After Its Kind. Approaches to the Comedia, eds. Matthew D. Stroud, Anne M.Pasero y Amy R. Williamsen, Kassel, Reichenberger, 1991: 22-36.
 Perry, Charles E. "The Question of Means and Magic in Alarcón's La prueba de las promesas," Bulletin of the Comediantes 27 (1975): 14-19.
 Schons, Dorothy, Apuntes y documentos nuevos para la biografía de Juan Ruiz de Alarcón y Mendoza (Chicago: 1929. Private edition) 
 Whicker, Jules. The Plays of Juan Ruiz de Alarcón. London: Tamesis, 2003.
Attribution

External links 
 
 
 

1580s births
1639 deaths
17th-century Spanish dramatists and playwrights
Writers from Guerrero
People from Taxco
Spanish male dramatists and playwrights
Mexican dramatists and playwrights
Mexican people of Asturian descent
University of Salamanca alumni
17th-century male writers
Baroque writers